This is a list of international submarine communications cables.  It does not include domestic cable systems, such as those on the coastlines of Japan, Italy, and Brazil.  All the cable systems listed below have landing points in two or more countries.  Several older cables, although no longer used for international telecommunications, are used for scientific purposes.  Others are simply abandoned.

A to Z list

A
AAE-1 — Asia Africa Europe Gateway; France, Italy, Greece, Egypt, Saudi Arabia, Djibouti, Yemen, Qatar, UAE, Oman, Pakistan, India, Myanmar, Cambodia, Thailand, Malaysia, Singapore, Vietnam, Hong Kong (in planning stage)
AAG — Asia America Gateway; Malaysia, Singapore, Thailand, Brunei, Vietnam, Hong Kong, the Philippines, Guam, Hawaii, Continental USA West Coast
AC-1 — Atlantic Crossing; USA, UK, Germany, the Netherlands
AC-2 — Atlantic Crossing, a.k.a. Yellow; USA-UK
ACC-1 - Asia Connect Cable System; Singapore, Indonesia, Australia, East Timor, Guam, USA
ACE — Africa Coast to Europe; France, Spain, Portugal, Morocco, Canary Islands (Spain), Western Sahara, Mauritania, Senegal, Gambia, Guinea, Sierra Leone, Liberia, Côte d'Ivoire, Ghana, Togo, Benin, Nigeria, Cameroon, São Tomé and Príncipe, Equatorial Guinea, Gabon, Congo, Angola, Namibia, South Africa
Aden-Djibouti — Yemen-Djibouti
ADRIA-1 — Croatia, Albania, Greece
AEConnect — Shirley, USA to Killala, Ireland 
AIS — Australia-Indonesia-Singapore (decommissioned)
AJC — Australia-Japan Cable
Alaska Communications System
ALETAR — Alexandria-Tarsous; Egypt-Syria
Alonso de Ojeda — Aruba-Curaçao
ALPAL-2 — Algiers-Palma de Mallorca; Algeria-Spain
AMERICAS-1 NORTH — USA-US Virgin Islands
AMERICAS-1 SOUTH — US Virgin Islands, Trinidad, Venezuela, Brazil
AMERICAS-II — USA, Puerto Rico, US Virgin Islands, Martinique, Curaçao, Trinidad, Venezuela, French Guiana, Brazil
Amitié - Bude, UK-Le Porge, France, Lynn, USA (due to go live 2022)
AMX-1 — United States, Mexico, Guatemala, Colombia, Dominican Republic, Puerto Rico, Brazil
ANNIBAL — France-Tunisia (decommissioned)
ANTILLAS I — Dominican Republic-Puerto Rico
Antilles Crossing Phase 1 — US Virgin Islands, St Lucia, Barbados
ANZAC Cable System - Australia (Melbourne and Tasmania including Flinders Island), New Zealand
ANZCAN — Australia, New Zealand, Canada (decommissioned)
APC — Asia-Pacific Cable; Japan, Taiwan, Hong Kong, Malaysia, Singapore 
APCN — Asia-Pacific Cable Network; Japan, Korea, Philippines, Taiwan, Hong Kong, Malaysia, Singapore, Thailand, Indonesia, Australia
APCN 2 — Asia-Pacific Cable Network 2; Japan, Korea, Philippines, Taiwan, China, Hong Kong, Malaysia, Singapore
APHRODITE-1 — Greece-Cyprus (decommissioned)
APHRODITE-2 — Greece-Cyprus
APNG-1 — Australia-Papua New Guinea (decommissioned)
APNG-2 — Australia-Papua New Guinea
APG — Asia-Pacific Gateway
Apollo — USA, UK, France
ARCOS-1 — Americas Region Caribbean Optical-ring System; USA, Mexico, Belize, Guatemala, Honduras, Nicaragua, Costa Rica, Panama, Colombia, Venezuela, Netherlands Antilles, Puerto Rico, Dominican Republic, Turks and Caicos Islands, Bahamas
:it:Arctic Fibre (italian) — UK, Canada, USA, Japan (planned) 
Arctic Link — UK, Canada, USA, Japan (planned)
ARIANE-2 — France-Greece
ASE (Asia Submarine Cable Express) — Singapore, Malaysia, Philippines, Singapore (2012)
ASEAN — Singapore, Philippines, Indonesia, Malaysia, Thailand (decommissioned)
ASH — American Samoa, Samoa, Hawaii
Atlantica-1/GlobeNet — USA, Bermuda, Venezuela, Brazil
ATLANTIS — Brazil, Senegal, Portugal (decommissioned)
ATLANTIS-2 — Argentina, Brazil, Senegal, Cape Verde Islands, Canary Islands, Madeira, Spain, Portugal
ATLAS — Portugal, Morocco (decommissioned)
Atlas Offshore — Morocco-France
Australia Singapore Cable — Australia - Singapore
Australia West Express (planned) — Perth - Diego Garcia - Djibouti

B
 BAHAMAS 2 - (USA-Bahamas)
 BALTICA - (Poland, Denmark, Sweden)
 Banjoewangi - Broome (Australia, Indonesia) (decommissioned)
 Barcelona - Pisa (Spain, Italy) (decommissioned)
 Barcelona - Rome (Spain, Italy) (decommissioned)
 BARGEN - (Cabrera de Mar, Barcelona-Genova) (Spain-Italy) (decommissioned)
 BARSAV - (Barcelona-Savona) (Spain-Italy) (decommissioned 2018)
 BCS - (Sweden, Lithuania, Latvia, Finland)
 BDSNi - (Bahamas Domestic Submarine Network international)
 BERYTAR - (Beirut-Tartous) (Syria-Lebanon)
 Bharat Lanka Cable System - (BLCS) (India-Sri Lanka)
 BICS - (Bahamas Internet Cable System)
 BMP - (Brunei, Malaysia, Philippines) (decommissioned)
 Botnia - (Sweden-Finland)
 BRCS - (Batam Rengit Cable System) (Indonesia - Malaysia)
 BS - (Brunei-Singapore) (decommissioned)
 BSCS - (Batam-Singapore Cable System) (Indonesia - Singapore)
 BSFOCS - (Black Sea Fibre Optic Cable System) (Bulgaria, Ukraine, Russia)
 BT-MT1 - (British Telecom - Manx Telecom) (UK-Isle of Man)
 BT-TE1 - (British Telecom - Telecom Éireann) (UK-Ireland)
 BUS-1 - (Bermuda-US - now a segment of GlobeNet)
 BDM - (Batam Dumai Malaka Cable System) (Indonesia - Malaysia)
 BBG - (BBG Bay of Bengal Gateway Cable System) (Barka - Fujairah - India - Sri Lanka - Malaysia - Singapore)

C
 C-J FOSC - (China-Japan Fibre Optic Submarine Cable)
 CADMOS - (Cyprus-Lebanon)
 Canal Zone - Jamaica (Panama, Jamaica) (decommissioned)
 CANTAT-1 - (Canada Transatlantic) - (Canada-UK) (decommissioned)
 CANTAT-2 - (Canada Transatlantic) - (Canada-UK) (decommissioned)
 CANTAT-3 - (Canada Transatlantic) - (Canada, Iceland, the Faeroes, UK, Denmark, Germany) (decommissioned)
 CANUS-1 - (Canada-USA)
 CARAC - (Caribbean Atlantic Cable) (Bermuda-Tortola)
 C-Lion1 - (Finland - Germany)
 Cayman-Jamaica
 CELTIX CONNECT - (UK-Ireland) (planned 2010)
 CFX - (USA-Colombia)
 Challenger - (USA-Bermuda)
 CIOS - (Cyprus-Israel Optical System) (Cyprus-Israel)
 CIRCE NORTH - (UK-the Netherlands)
 CIRCE SOUTH - (UK-France)
 CKC - (China-Korea Cable) (PRC-South Korea) (decommissioned)
 CNSFTC - (Central North Sea Fibre Telecommunications Company) - (UK-North Sea oil platforms)
 Colombia-Jamaica-Florida
 COLUMBUS II - (USA-Mexico-Italy)
 COLUMBUS III - (USA-Azores-Portugal-Italy)
 Commonwealth Pacific Cable (COMPAC) (Canada, USA, Fiji, New Zealand, Australia) (decommissioned - portions in scientific use)
 Concerto 1 - (Triangular UK-Belgium-the Netherlands)
 CS2 - (Sydney-Solomon Islands), (Sydney-Papua New Guinea)
 Corfù–Bar - (Greece-Montenegro)
 CORSAR - (Corsica-Sardinia) (France-Italy)
 Cuba-Venezuela - Cuba-Venezuela (ALBA-1)
 CUCN - (China-US Cable Network) (Korea-US-China-Japan-Guam)

D
 Danica North (Denmark-Sweden)
 Danica South (Denmark-Sweden)
 DANICE - (Denmark-Iceland)
 Darwin - Banjoewangi (Australia, Indonesia) (decommissioned)
 Denmark-Norway 5
 Denmark-Norway 6
 Denmark-Poland 2
 Denmark-Russia 1
 Denmark-Sweden 15
 Denmark-Sweden 16
 Denmark-Sweden 17
 Denmark-Sweden 18
 DMCS - (Dumai-Melaka Cable System) (Indonesia-Malaysia)
 Dunant - US-France - went live 2020
 DSCS - (Dhiraagu & Sri Lanka Telecom Cable System) (Maldives-Sri Lanka)

E
 EAC-C2C - (East Asia Crossing/C2C) (Japan, South Korea, Taiwan, China, Hong Kong, Singapore, Philippines, Vietnam, Guam, USA)
 Eagle - (Japan-USA) - planned
 EASSy - (an East Africa Submarine Cable System with endpoints in South Africa and the Sudan)
 EC-1 - (Eastern Link Cable System) (Trinidad, Netherlands Antilles)
 ECFS - (Eastern Caribbean Fibre System) (Trinidad, Grenada, St Vincent, Barbados, St Lucia, Martinique, Dominica, Guadeloupe, Montserrat, Antigua, St Kitts, St Maarten, Anguilla, Tortola)
 ECSC - (Japan, China) (decommissioned - portions in scientific use)
 EDF1 (INGRID) - (Jersey, France)
 EDF2 (INGRID) - (Guernsey, Jersey, France)
 EE-S1 - (Estonia-Sweden 1) (Estonia-Sweden)
 EESF-2 - (Estonia-Finland)
 EESF-3 - (Estonia-Finland)
 EIG - (Europe India Gateway) (UK, Portugal, Gibraltar, France, Monaco, Libya, Egypt, Saudi Arabia, Djibouti, Oman, UAE, India)
 EMOS 1 - (Eastern Mediterranean Optical System) (Greece, Israel, Turkey, Italy)
 ESAT 1 - (Wexford to Cornwall)
 ESAT 2 - (Dublin to Ainsdale)
 Estepona–Tetuán - (Morocco, Spain)
 EURAFRICA - (Portugal, Morocco, France)

F
 FALCON - see FLAG FALCON below.
 FARICE-1 - (UK-Faroes-Iceland)
 FARLAND - (UK-the Netherlands)
 FASTER - (USA-Japan-Taiwan)
 FEC - (Finland Estonia Connection)
 Fehmarn Belt - (Denmark-Germany)
 Fibralink - (Jamaica-Dominican Republic)
 FLAG FA-1 - (FLAG Atlantic) (USA, UK, France)
 FLAG FALCON - (FLAG Alcatel-Lucent Optical Network) - (Bahrain, Egypt, India, Iran, Iraq, Jordan, Kenya, Kuwait, Maldives, Oman, Qatar, Saudi Arabia, Sri Lanka, Sudan, UAE, Yemen)
 FLAG FEA - (FLAG Europe-Asia) (UK, Spain, Italy, Jordan, Egypt, Saudi Arabia, United Arab Emirates, India, Malaysia, Thailand, Hong Kong, China, South Korea, Japan)
 FLAG FNAL - (FLAG North Asian Loop) (Hong Kong, Taiwan, South Korea, Japan)
 Florida-Jamaica - (USA, Jamaica) (decommissioned)
 FLAG FP-1 - (FLAG Pacific) (Japan, Canada, USA)
 FOG - (Fiber Optic Gulf) (UAE-Qatar-Bahrain-Kuwait)
 FOG2 - (Fiber Optic Gulf 2) (UAE-Iraq-Saudi Arabia)
 France-Algeria (decommissioned)
 France-Greece (decommissioned)
 France-Morocco (decommissioned)
 France-Tunisia (decommissioned)

G
 G-P - (Guam-Philippines)
 GCN - (Global Caribbean Network) (Guadeloupe, St. Martin, Ste. Croix, Puerto Rico)
 Gemini - (USA, UK, Bermuda)
 Georgia-Russia
 Germany-Denmark 1 (decommissioned)
 Germany-Denmark 2
 Germany-Sweden 4 (decommissioned)
 Germany-Sweden 5 (decommissioned)
 GLO-1 - (Globacom-1) (Nigeria, Ghana, Senegal, Mauritania, Morocco, Portugal, Spain, UK) (planned)
 GO-1 - (Italy-Malta)
 Gondwana-1 - (New Caledonia, Australia)
 Gotland-Ventspils - (Sweden-Latvia)
 GPT - (Guam-Philippines-Taiwan) (decommissioned)
 Grace Hopper - (Transatlantic - Bude, New York, Bilbao) - (live 2021)
 Greenland Connect - (Canada-Greenland-Iceland)
 Gulf Bridge International - (Linking the GCC countries (Bahrain, Iran, Iraq, the Kingdom of Saudi Arabia, Kuwait, Oman, Qatar and the UAE) to each other and onwards to Europe, Africa and Asia) - (planned for 2012)
 GWEN - (Greece to Western Europe Network) (Italy - Greece)

H
 HANNIBAL - (Tunisia-Italy)
 HANTRU-1 - (Guam - Pohnpei (FSM) - Majuro (Marshall Islands) - Kwajalein)
 Havfrue - (New Jersey, US - Blaabjerg, Denmark - branches to Ireland and Norway). Sold under the brand name America Europe Connect-2 = AEC-2. (Live in Q4 2020) 
 Hawaiki - (New Zealand, Australia, American Samoa, Hawaii, Pacific City) - under construction
 Hawk - (France-Tunisia-Libya-Italy-Turkey-Cyprus-Syria-Egypt) - planned
 HERMES-1 - (UK-Belgium)
 HERMES-2 - (UK-Netherlands)
 Hibernia Atlantic - (UK, Ireland, Canada, USA)
 HJK - (Hong Kong-Japan-Korea) (decommissioned)
 Honotua - (Tahiti-Hawaii)
 HONTAI-2 - (Hong Kong-Taiwan) (decommissioned)
 HSCS - (Hokkaido-Sakhalin Cable System) (Russia - Japan)
 HUGO - (High capacity, Undersea Guernsey Optical-fibre) (UK, Guernsey, France)
 HUGO East - (High capacity, Undersea Guernsey Optical-fibre) (France, Jersey, Guernsey)

I
 I-ME-WE - (India-Middle East-Western Europe) (India, Pakistan, UAE, Saudi Arabia, Egypt, the Lebanon, Italy, France) 
 i2i - (India-Singapore)
 India-UAE
 INDIGO-West (Australia-Indonesia-Singapore)
 IOCOM - (India-Malaysia) (decommissioned)
 Ir-UK Seg A - (Ireland-UK)
 Ir-UK Seg B - (Ireland-UK)
 Italy-Albania
 Italy-Croatia
 Italy-Greece
 Italy-Libya
 Italy-Malta
 Italy-Monaco
 Italy-Tunisia
 ITUR - (Italy-Turkey-Ukraine-Russia)

J
 Japan-US
 JAKABARE - (Java - Kalimantan - Batam - Singapore) (Indonesia-Singapore)
 JASURAUS - (Jakarta - Surabaya - Australia) (Indonesia-Australia) (Decommissioned)
 Jersey-Guernsey 4
 JKC - (Japan-Korea) (decommissioned - portions in scientific use)
 JNAC - (USA, Japan, China, South Korea, Taiwan) (planned, but not built)
 JONAH (Bezeq International Optical System) – (Israel, Cyprus, Italy)

K
 KAFOS - (Karadeniz Fiber Optik Sistemi) (Turkey, Bulgaria, Romania)
 KATTEGAT-1 - (Denmark-Sweden)
 KATTEGAT-2 - (Denmark-Sweden)
 KELTRA-2 - (Kelibia-Trapani) (Tunisia-Italy)
 Key West-Havana 5 (USA, Cuba) (decommissioned - portions in scientific use)
 Key West-Havana 6 (USA, Cuba) (decommissioned - portions in scientific use)
 KDN-Reliance - (Yemen - Kenya) (planned for 2007)
 KJCN - (Korea-Japan Cable Network)
 Kuwait-Iran

L
 La Perouse-Nelson - (Australia, New Zealand) (decommissioned)
 La Perouse-Wakapauka - (Australia, New Zealand) (decommissioned)
 LANIS-1 - (Isle of Man-UK)
 LANIS-2 - (Northern Ireland (UK) -Isle of Man)
 LANIS-3 - (Northern Ireland-Scotland)
 LEV - (Italy, Cyprus, Israel)
 Liberty - (UK, Guernsey, Jersey, France)
 LION - (Lower Indian Ocean Network) (Madagascar, Reunion, Mauritius)
 LV-SE 1 - (Latvia-Sweden)
 LSP - (Libya-Crete, Greece)

M
 MAC - (Mid-Atlantic Crossing) (USA, St. Croix)
 Main One - (Portugal, Ghana, Nigeria, South Africa) (planned)
 SLT-Dhiraagu Cable System Maldives-Sri Lanka
 Malaysia-Thailand
 MAREA
 MARS - (Mauritius, Rodrigues)
 Marseille-Palermo - (France-Italy)
 MARTEL (Marseille - Tel Aviv) (decommissioned)
 MAT-2 - (Italy-Spain)
 MAYA-1 - (USA, Mexico, Cayman Islands, Honduras, Costa Rica, Panama, Colombia)
 MCN - (Mid-Caribbean Network) (Guadeloupe, Dominica, Martinique)
 MCS - (Matrix Cable System) (Indonesia-Singapore)
 MedNautilus - (Italy, Greece, Turkey, Israel, Cyprus)
 MED Cable - (France-Algeria)
 METISS Cable - (Mauritius-Reunion Island-Madagascar-South Africa) (Planned)
 MENA - (Middle East North Africa) (Italy, Greece, Egypt, Saudi Arabia, Oman)
 MIC-1 - (Moratel International Cable 1) (Batam, Singapore)
 Micronesia Cable System -
 MINERVA - (Cyprus-Italy)
 Monet (submarine cable)
 MOYLE NORTH - (Northern Ireland-Scotland)
 MOYLE SOUTH - (Northern Ireland-Scotland)
 MT - (Malaysia-Thailand)
 MTC - (Guam, Marianas Islands)

N
 NACS - (North Asia Cable System) (Hong Kong,China; Taiwan; Japan)
 NAFSIKA - (Italy-Greece)
 NCP - (New Cross Pacific Cable Network) (USA; Japan; South Korea; China; Taiwan)
 New Jersey-Bermuda - (USA, Bermuda) (decommissioned)
 New Zealand-Fiji - (decommissioned)
 NorSea Com 1 - (Norway-UK)
 NPC - (North Pacific Cable) - (USA, Japan) (decommissioned)

O
 ODIN - (the Netherlands, Denmark, Norway) (portions decommissioned)
 Okinawa-Luzon-Hong Kong - (Hong Kong, the Philippines, Japan) (decommissioned - portions in scientific use)
 Oman Australia Cable - (Oman-Australia)
 Otranto-Corfù - (Italy-Greece)
 ORVAL - (Algeria-Spain) (expected to enter into operation in 2018)
 Orient Express (cable system) - (Pakistan - UAE)

P
 PAC - (Pan-American Crossing) (California, Mexico, Panama, Venezuela, and the Caribbean)
 Pacific Caribbean Cable System - (PCCS) Operational since 2015
 PacRimEast - (Pacific Rim East) (New Zealand-Hawaii) (decommissioned)
 PacRimWest - (Pacific Rim West) (Australia-Guam) (decommissioned)
 Pakistan-UAE-2
 PAN AM - (Pan-American Cable System)
 Pangea - (UK-Denmark & UK-the Netherlands)
 Pangea (Baltic Sea) - (Sweden, Estonia, Finland)
 PC-1 - (Pacific Crossing) (California, Washington and Japan)
 PEC - (Pan-European Crossing)
 PLCN - Pacific Light Cable Network (California, US - Taiwan - Philippines)
 PPC-1 - (Pipe Pacific Cable)(Australia, Papua New Guinea, Guam)
 Portugal-UK - (decommissioned)
 Project Express - (Hibernia Atlantic's Project Express)(Canada-UK)
 PTAT-1 - (Private Trans-Atlantic Telecommunications System) (USA-UK)

Q
 Qatar-UAE 1
 Qatar-UAE 2
 Quantum Cable

R
REMBRANDT-1 - (United Kingdom - The Netherlands) (decommissioned)
REMBRANDT-2 - (United Kingdom - The Netherlands)
RIOJA-1 - (United Kingdom - Spain) (decommissioned)
RIOJA-2 - (United Kingdom - Belgium) (decommissioned)
RIOJA-3 - (Belgium - The Netherlands) (decommissioned)
RJCN - (Russia-Japan Cable Network) (Russia, Japan)
RJK - (Russia-Japan-Korea)
RNAL - (Reach North Asia Loop) (Hong Kong - Taiwan - Japan, Hong Kong - Korea - Japan)
Russian Optical Trans-Arctic Submarine Cable System (ROTACS) - (UK, Russia, China, Japan) (planned)

S
 SAC - (South American Crossing)
 SACS - (South Atlantic Cable System)
 SAex - (South Atlantic Express)
 SAFE - (South Africa-Far East) (South Africa, Mauritius, India, Malaysia)
 SAm-1 - (South America-1)
 SAS - (Samoa-American Samoa)
 SAS-1 - (Saudi Arabia-Sudan)
 SAT-1 - (South Atlantic) (South Africa, Ascension (UK), Cape Verde, Spain, Portugal) (decommissioned)
 SAT-2 - (South Atlantic) (South Africa, Spain, Portugal)
 SAT-3/WASC - (South Atlantic 3/West Africa Submarine Cable) (Portugal, Spain, Senegal, Côte d'Ivoire, Ghana, Benin, Nigeria, Cameroon, Gabon, Angola, South Africa)
 SCAN - (Submarine Cable Asia Network) (Indonesia, Hong Kong) - planned
 Scandinavian Ring
 SEA-ME-WE 1 – (South East Asia-Middle East-Western Europe) (decommissioned)
 SEA-ME-WE 2 – (South East Asia-Middle East-Western Europe) (decommissioned)
 SEA-ME-WE 3 – (South East Asia-Middle East-Western Europe)
 SEA-ME-WE 4 – (South East Asia-Middle East-Western Europe)
 SEA-ME-WE 5 – (South East Asia-Middle East-Western Europe)
 Seabras-1 - (USA-Brazil)
 SEACOM - (Singapore-Jesselton(Kota Kinabalu)-Hong Kong-Guam-Madang-Cairns) (decommissioned)
 SEACOM - (South Africa, Madagascar, Mozambique, Tanzania, Kenya, India and Europe)
 SF-S5 - (Sweden-Finland) (decommissioned)
 SFL - (Sweden-Finland Link)
 SFS-4 - (Sweden-Finland)
 SG-SCS - (Suriname-Guyana Submarine Cable System) (Trinidad-Guyana-Suriname)
 SHEFA-2 - (Shetland-Faroes) (UK-Faroes)
 SIRIUS NORTH - (Northern Ireland-Scotland)
 SIRIUS SOUTH - (Ireland-England)
 SJC - (Indonesia, Singapore, Malaysia, Thailand, the Philippines, Hong Kong, China, Japan) - planned
 SMPR-1 -  (St. Maarten-Puerto Rico)
 SOLAS - (Ireland-UK)
 Southern Caribbean Fiber - (St Kitts, Martinique, St Lucia, St Vincent and the Grenadines, Grenada, Trinidad and Tobago, Barbados, Guadeloupe, Antigua)
 Southern Cross - (Australia, New Zealand, Fiji, United States)

T
 T-V-H - (Thailand-Vietnam-Hong Kong)
 TAGIDE-2 - (France-Portugal) (decommissioned)
 TAIGU - (Taiwan-Guam) (decommissioned)
 TAILU - (Taiwan-Luzon) (decommissioned)
 TAINO CARIB - (Puerto Rico, US Virgin Islands, British Virgin Islands)
 TampNet - (Norway-North Sea Oil Platforms)
 Tangerine - (UK-Belgium)
 TASMAN 1 - (Australia-New Zealand) (decommissioned)
 TASMAN 2 - (Australia-New Zealand)
 TAT-1 - (UK-Canada) (decommissioned)
 TAT-2 - (France-Canada) (decommissioned)
 TAT-3 - (UK-USA) (decommissioned)
 TAT-4 - (France-USA) (decommissioned)
 TAT-5 - (Spain-USA) (decommissioned)
 TAT-6 - (France-USA) (decommissioned)
 TAT-7 - (UK-USA) (decommissioned)
 TAT-8 - (USA, UK, France) (decommissioned)
 TAT-9 - (USA, Canada, Spain) (decommissioned)
 TAT-10 - (Germany-USA) (decommissioned)
 TAT-11 - (USA, France, UK) (decommissioned)
 TAT-12/13 - (USA, UK, France) (decommissioned)
 TAT-14 - (USA, UK, France, the Netherlands, Germany, Denmark) (decommissioned)
 TBL - (Trans-Balkan Line) (Italy-Albania, continuing overland through Macedonia, Bulgaria, and into Turkey)
 TCCN - (Trans Caribbean Cable Network) - (USA-Jamaica)
 TCS-1 - (Trans-Caribbean System 1)  (decommissioned)
 TE North - (Telecom Egypt North) (France-Egypt)
 TEAMS - (The East African Marine System) (UAE-Kenya)
 Telstra Endeavour - (Sydney-Hawaii)
 TGA (Tasman Global Access) - (Australia-New Zealand)
 TIC or TIISCS - (Tata Indicom Cable) or (Tata Indicom India-Singapore Cable System) (India-Singapore)
 TIS - (Thailand-Indonesia-Singapore)
 TPC-1/TRANSPAC-1 - (Trans Pacific Cable) - (Hong Kong, the Philippines, Japan, Guam, Hawaii) (decommissioned - portions in scientific use)
 TPC-2/TRANSPAC-2 - (Trans Pacific Cable) - (Singapore, Hong Kong, South Korea, Taiwan, Guam) (decommissioned - portions in scientific use)
 TPC-3/TRANSPAC-3 - (Trans Pacific Cable) (decommissioned)
 TPC-4 - (Trans Pacific Cable) (decommissioned)
 TPC-5CN - (Trans Pacific Cable) - (Japan, Guam, Hawaii, USA)
 TPE - (Trans-Pacific Express) (China, Korea, Taiwan, USA)
 TPE2 - (Trans-Pacific Express) (China, Korea, Taiwan, USA, Japan)
 TPICK (Telecommunication Plan for Improvement of Communications in Korea) - runs the length of Korea to mainland Japan via Changson-Tsushima-Seburiyama
 Trinidad-Curacao
 TSE-1 (Taiwan Strait Express 1) (First cable directly connecting Taiwan and mainland China)
 TWA-1 (Transworld Associates) (UAE-Oman-Pakistan)

U
 UGARIT - (Cyprus-Syria)
 UK-Belgium 5 (decommissioned)
 UK-Belgium 6 (decommissioned)
 UK-Channel Isles 7
 UK-Channel Isles 8
 UK-Denmark 4 (decommissioned)
 UK-France 3
 UK-France 4 (decommissioned)
 UK-Germany 5
 UK-Germany 6
 UK-Netherlands 12 (decommissioned)
 UK-Netherlands 14
 UK-Spain 4 (decommissioned)
 ULYSSES-1 - (UK-France)
 ULYSSES-2 - (UK-the Netherlands)
 UNISUR - (Argentina, Uruguay, Brazil)
 UNITY - (Japan-USA)

V
 Ventspils-Farosund (Gotland)-Stockholm
 VSNL Northern Europe - (UK-Netherlands)
 VSNL Western Europe - (UK, Portugal, Spain)
 VSNL SG HK JP Guam - (Singapore, Hong Kong, Japan, Guam)
 VSNL Transatlantic - (UK-USA)
 VSNL Transpacific - (Japan, Guam, USA)
 VMSCS - (Vodafone Malta-Sicily Cable System) (Italy-Malta)

W
 WACS - (West Africa Cable System) (South Africa, Namibia, Angola, the Democratic Republic of the Congo, the Republic of Congo, Cameroon, Nigeria, Togo, Ghana, Côte d'Ivoire, Cape Verde, Canary Islands, Portugal, United Kingdom)
 WAFS - (West Africa Festoon System)
 WASC - (West Africa Submarine Cable)

X

Y
 Yellow/AC2 - (USA-UK)

Z

See also

List of domestic submarine communications cables

References

External links
NetworkAtlas.com — Network Atlas - Global Internet Infrastructure Atlas
SubmarineCableMap.com — simple map
Detailed interactive world map — at TeleGeography.com (2018 Version)
Global Caribbean net — reference site for GCN, MCN, and SCF
Timeline of submarine cables, 1850-2007 — at Atlantic-Cable.com
TeleGeography submarine cable map — at TeleGeography.com
The International Cable Protection Committee — at ISCPC.org, includes a register of submarine cables worldwide (though not always updated as often as one might hope)
United Kingdom Cable Protection Committee — at UKCPC.org.uk
Kingfisher Information Service — at KISCA.org.uk, source of free maps of cable routes around the United Kingdom
France Telecom's fishermen's/submarine cable information — at SigCables.com
Oregon Fisherman's Cable Committee — at OFCC.com
SAT3 WASC SAFE undersea cable — at Safe-Sat3.co.za
Comprehensive list of cable landing sites globally — at KIDORF.com
List of the suppliers of the world's undersea communications cables — at KIDORF.com

Map of all submarine communications cables currently in use — at KDDI.com, July 2002
Map and satellite views of US landing sites for transatlantic cables — at Eyeball-Series.org
Map and satellite views of US landing sites for transpacific cables — at Eyeball-Series.org
Gazetteer of submarine cable systems — at Futures-Perfect.com, cables in service, updated regularly
Google Maps mashup — from CableMap.info

Coastal construction